Paul Haugh (May 12, 1896 – April 11, 1966) was an American farmer and legislator.

Born in the Town of Union, Vernon County, Wisconsin, Haugh served in the United States Army during World War I. He was a farmer, director and secretary of a fire mutual insurance company. Haugh served on the town and Vernon County boards. He served in the Wisconsin State Assembly in 1959 as a Democrat. Haugh died in Madison, Wisconsin.

Notes

1896 births
1966 deaths
People from Vernon County, Wisconsin
County supervisors in Wisconsin
20th-century American politicians
Democratic Party members of the Wisconsin State Assembly